The West Indian national cricket team toured Pakistan from October to December 1997 and played a three-match Test series against the Pakistani national cricket team. Pakistan won the Test series 3–0. West Indies were captained by Courtney Walsh and Pakistan by Wasim Akram. In addition, the teams played in an international Limited Overs Internationals (LOI) which was won by South Africa.

Test series summary

1st Test

2nd Test

3rd Test

References

External links

1997 in Pakistani cricket
1997 in West Indian cricket
International cricket competitions from 1997–98 to 2000
Pakistani cricket seasons from 1970–71 to 1999–2000
1997-98